Angostura is an unincorporated area and census-designated place (CDP) in Fall River County, South Dakota, United States. The population was 159 at the 2020 census. It was first listed as a CDP prior to the 2020 census.

It is northeast of the center of the county, between U.S. Routes 18/385 to the northeast and Angostura Reservoir to the southwest. Residential development is primarily in the Angostura Heights area in the southern part of the CDP. The shoreline area next to the reservoir is part of the state-managed Angostura Recreation Area.

Demographics

References 

Census-designated places in Fall River County, South Dakota
Census-designated places in South Dakota